Kalashnikovo is the name of several inhabited localities in Russia.

Modern localities
Urban localities
Kalashnikovo, Tver Oblast, an urban-type settlement in Likhoslavlsky District of Tver Oblast

Rural localities
Kalashnikovo, Perm Krai, a village in Kungursky District of Perm Krai

Abolished localities
Kalashnikovo, Omsk Oblast, a village in Souskanovsky Rural Okrug of Tarsky District in Omsk Oblast; abolished in November 2008